Yumie Kobayashi (born 14 August 1977) is a Japanese luger. She competed at the 1998 Winter Olympics and the 2002 Winter Olympics.

References

External links
 

1977 births
Living people
Japanese female lugers
Olympic lugers of Japan
Lugers at the 1998 Winter Olympics
Lugers at the 2002 Winter Olympics
Sportspeople from Sapporo